Andreea Tecar (born 21 March 1998) is a Romanian female handball player for HC Zalău. 

As a junior, she finished fourth in the 2015 European Youth Championship.

References
 

1998 births
Living people
Sportspeople from Baia Mare
Romanian female handball players 
CS Minaur Baia Mare (women's handball) players